TRAX is a three-line urban light rail mass transit system operated by the Utah Transit Authority (UTA), serving much of the Salt Lake Valley in Utah, United States. (The official name of TRAX is Transit Express, however this name is almost never used.) Communities served by the service include Draper, Midvale, Murray, Salt Lake City, Sandy, South Jordan, South Salt Lake, West Jordan, and West Valley City.

Description
The network consists of three lines: the Blue Line (previously referred to as the Sandy Line), which opened in 1999; the Red Line (previously referred to as the University Line), which opened in 2001; and the Green Line, which opened in 2011. As of December 2012, the network serves over 60,600 passengers a day, making TRAX the 9th-largest light rail system in the United States in ridership. There are 50 stations on the 3 lines of the UTA TRAX system, with an overall length of the network being .

The stations along the UTA TRAX network are open-air structures featuring passenger canopies for protection from adverse weather. Many of the canopies are designed to resemble the canopy at the Joseph Smith Memorial Building (which is located Downtown and listed on the National Register of Historic Places). Works of public art included at several stations were developed as part of the UTA's Art in Transit program. At first the program was met with skepticism; initially, only the stations constructed in Salt Lake City incorporated public art into their designs. This was the case as the city was initially the only one to take part in the Art in Transit program. The program has since grown in popularity, and many of the stations constructed as part of the FrontLines 2015 expansion will include public art in their final design.

Nearly all stations, except those in Downtown Salt Lake City, have a Park and Ride lot with free parking. TRAX Park and Ride lots may have as few as six parking spaces or as many as nearly 1200.  Many of the Downtown Salt Lake City stations are located within the Free Fare Zone which allows riders that both enter and exit TRAX and/or UTA buses service within the Zone to ride with no charge. Stations within the Zone include Arena, City Center, Courthouse, Gallivan Plaza, Library, Old GreekTown, Planetarium, Salt Lake Central, and Temple Square.

All of UTA's TRAX and FrontRunner trains and stations, streetcars and streetcar stops, and all fixed route buses are compliant with Americans with Disabilities Act and are therefore accessible to those with disabilities. Signage at the stations, on the passenger platforms, and on the trains clearly indicate accessibility options. Ramps on the passenger platforms on the Blue Line and assistance from the train operator may be necessary for wheelchair boarding (weekdays only).  These ramps are not used on weekends nor on the Red or Green Lines.  In accordance with the Utah Clean Air Act and UTA ordinance, "smoking is prohibited on UTA vehicles as well as UTA bus stops, TRAX stations, and FrontRunner stations".

History

UTA's TRAX began service on December 4, 1999, with the opening of what was then called the Sandy/Salt Lake Line (now called the Blue Line) which ran from Sandy Civic Center to Delta Center (now called Arena). The line saw construction of a pair of infill stations with the opening of 900 South in 2005 and Sandy Expo in 2006 and the 650 South in 2022 as a result of demand for additional service. The University Line (TRAX) commenced service on 15 December 2001 between Stadium and Delta Center. The line expanded in April 2008, when three new stations opened between Planetarium and Salt Lake Central. The Sandy/University Line began service on December 17, 2001, between Stadium and Sandy Civic Center. Originally operating on a limited schedule, by August 2009, trains were added to the line serving all stations between Sandy Civic Center and University Medical Center. Expansion as part of the FrontLines 2015 project saw the completion of an additional  of track by August 2013. The completion of the Airport and Draper extensions added service to the Salt Lake City International Airport and Draper.

Salt Lake Central (which is part of the Salt Lake City Intermodal Hub) connects with FrontRunner commuter rail (with service from Weber County through Davis County and Salt Lake County to Utah County), as well as Amtrak and Greyhound Lines. In addition Murray Central and North Temple Bridge/Guadalupe also connect with FrontRunner. In December 2013 the first phase of the S Line (formerly known as Sugar House Streetcar) project opened for service with a connection at Central Pointe in South Salt Lake.

Stations

Future stations
The Utah Transit Authority is undertaking a major expansion called FrontLines 2015. As part of this project UTA will add  of track to the existing  light-rail network as defined in the Utah Transit Authority's 2030 Long-range Transportation Plan. All of the expansions were completed and opened for service by August 2013 (except the 14600 South and Highland Drive Stations). Six of the stations are part of the Airport extension of the Green Line.  Three completed stations and two more proposed stations are or will be part of the Draper extension of the Blue Line.

See also
 TRAX (light rail)
 Blue Line
 Green Line
 Red Line
 The FrontRunner train
 S Line (formerly known as Sugar House Streetcar)

Notes

References

Transportation in Salt Lake City
Transportation in Salt Lake County, Utah
Lists of metro stations
Lists of railway stations in the United States
Lists of buildings and structures in Utah
Utah transportation-related lists
Utah Transit Authority